Michael Martin Hammer (April 13, 1948 – Sept 3, 2008) was a Jewish-American engineer, management author, and a former professor of computer science at the Massachusetts Institute of Technology (MIT), known as one of the founders of the management theory of Business process reengineering (BPR).

Biography

Early life and education
Hammer, the child of Holocaust survivors, grew up in Annapolis, Maryland. He earned BS, MS, and Ph.D. degrees in EECS from the Massachusetts Institute of Technology in 1968, 1970, and 1973 respectively.

Career
An engineer by training, Hammer was the proponent of a process-oriented view of business management.  He was a professor at the Massachusetts Institute of Technology in the department of Computer Science and a lecturer in the MIT Sloan School of Management. Articles written by Hammer have been published in business periodicals, such as the Harvard Business Review and The Economist.

TIME named him as one of America's 25 most influential individuals, in its first such list. Forbes magazine ranked Hammer's book, Reengineering the Corporation, among the "three most important business books of the past 20 years".

Personal life
He and his wife, Phyllis Thurm Hammer, lived in Newton, Massachusetts with their four children, Jessica, Allison, Dana, and David.

Death
Hammer died suddenly from complications of a brain hemorrhage he suffered while on vacation, and he is buried in the Baker Street Jewish Cemeteries in Boston.

Publications

Reengineering the Corporation: A manifesto for Business Revolution (1993), which Hammer he co-authored with James A. Champy, was instrumental in capturing the focus of business community towards Business Process Reengineering (BPR). 2.5 million copies of the book were sold, and the book remained on the New York Times Best Seller list for more than a year.
The Reengineering Revolution (1995) 
Beyond Reengineering (1996)
The Agenda (2001)
Faster, Cheaper, Better (2010), co-authored with Lisa Hershman

See also 
 Business Process
 Business Process Improvement

References

External links 

 Hammer and Company — Official website of the company run by Michael Hammer
 MIT Class of 1968 Tribute to Michael Hammer

1948 births
2008 deaths
American computer scientists
20th-century American engineers
20th-century American economists
MIT School of Engineering alumni
MIT School of Engineering faculty
MIT Sloan School of Management faculty
People from Newton, Massachusetts